Mary Jo Buttafuoco (née Connery; born May 15, 1955) is an American author and motivational speaker. In 1992, she was shot in the face by Amy Fisher, a teenager against whom her husband had committed statutory rape.

Shooting
On May 19, 1992, Buttafuoco was shot in the face by Amy Fisher, who at the time was having an affair with Buttafuoco's then husband Joey. Fisher had come to the Buttafuocos' house to confront Buttafuoco about Joey, with whom she had been having an affair since July 1991 after Fisher brought her vehicle to Buttafuoco's auto body shop in Baldwin, Nassau County, New York. When Buttafuoco answered the door, Fisher—posing as her own (fictitious) sister Ann Marie—offered, as proof of the affair, a T-shirt that Joey had given her with the logo of his auto body shop on it. This confrontation escalated when Buttafuoco demanded that Fisher leave. She turned to go into the house and call Joey when Fisher shot her in the face with a .25 caliber semiautomatic pistol. Once Buttafuoco regained consciousness, she identified Fisher as her assailant from the t-shirt Fisher had shown her before the shooting. Buttafuoco was left deafened in one ear and her face partially paralyzed.

Aftermath
Fisher was sentenced to five to 15 years in prison. She served seven years and was granted parole in May 1999. Joey Buttafuoco pleaded guilty to one count of statutory rape and served four months in jail. Buttafuoco and her husband later moved to Southern California. She stayed defensively loyal to her husband for several years. She even defended him when he was arrested in 1995 for sexual solicitation in Los Angeles. During this time, Buttafuoco consistently blamed others, such as Fisher, instead of her husband. She eventually filed divorce papers in Ventura County Superior Court on February 3, 2003.

In 2006, Buttafuoco underwent a facial reanimation procedure with facial plastic surgeon Babak Azizzadeh, involving static facial suspension, face lift, and eye lift procedures. These surgeries restored balance and gave her back her ability to smile. Next was surgery to widen the ear canal, which improved her hearing and prevented future infections. She also underwent physical therapy to strengthen her facial muscles, which she explained in an appearance on The Oprah Winfrey Show. Buttafuoco is still paralyzed on one side of her face and deaf in one ear.

Career
Sixteen years after the incident, Buttafuoco wrote a book telling her story, Getting It Through My Thick Skull: Why I Stayed, What I Learned, and What Millions of People Involved with Sociopaths Need to Know. She was inspired to write the book after her son referred to her ex-husband as a sociopath. Not knowing what the word meant, she looked it up and had a realization which led to her going public with her story. The title of the book comes from a saying her mother often used with her, "when are you going to get it through your thick skull?" The memoir describes her life, not just focusing on her shooting. She describes how she felt manipulated to stay with a person who was a sociopath.  Booklist called the book, which was published in July 2009, "strangely compelling," and said that "Readers will want to know – why did she stay with him?"

Buttafuoco has used her story to raise awareness of facial paralysis.

Personal life
Buttafuoco has two children: Paul Buttafuoco and Jessica Buttafuoco. In 2012, Buttafuoco married Stu Tendler in Las Vegas. Tendler died from cancer in 2018.

References

External links
 
 Mary Jo Buttafuoco's memoir
 Mary Jo Buttafuoco's appearance on The Oprah Winfrey Show

1955 births
21st-century American writers
21st-century American women writers
American shooting survivors
American victims of crime
Living people
Writers from New York (state)
Women shooting survivors